USA-200, also known as NRO Launch 28 or NROL-28, is an American signals intelligence satellite, operated by the National Reconnaissance Office. Launched in 2008, it has been identified as the second satellite in a series known as Improved Trumpet, Advanced Trumpet, or Trumpet follow-on; a replacement for the earlier Trumpet series of satellites.

Launch 
USA-200 was launched by an Atlas V launch vehicle, flying in the 411 configuration, operated by United Launch Alliance. The launch vehicle was the first Atlas V to launch from Vandenberg Air Force Base, flying from Space Launch Complex 3E. Liftoff occurred at 10:02 UTC on 13 March 2008. It was identified as NRO Launch 28, and was the thirteenth flight of an Atlas V. The launch vehicle had the tail number AV-006.

Orbit 
The satellite's orbit and mission are officially classified, however like most classified spacecraft it has been located and tracked by amateur observers.

Instruments 
In addition to its SIGINT payload, USA-200 also carries two secondary instruments; the SBIRS-HEO 2 missile detection payload as part of the Space-Based Infrared System programme, and NASA's TWINS-2 or TWINS-B magnetospheric science instrument as part of the TWINS programme.

See also 

 Explorer program

References 

Spacecraft launched in 2008
National Reconnaissance Office satellites
USA satellites
Early warning satellites